Calm, Cool & Collette is an album by multi-instrumentalist and composer Buddy Collette recorded at sessions in early 1957 and released on the ABC Paramount label.

Reception

The Allmusic site rated the album with 3 stars.

Track listing
All compositions by Buddy Collette except as indicated
 "Winston Walks" (John Goodman) - 2:54
 "If She Had Stayed" (Dick Shreve) - 3:32
 "They Can't Take That Away from Me" (George Gershwin, Ira Gershwin) - 3:45
 "Undecided" (Charlie Shavers, Sid Robin) - 3:10
 "Flute in "D"" - 4:47
 "The Continental" (Con Conrad, Herb Magidson) - 3:05
 "Three and One" - 3:30
 "Night in Tunisia" (Dizzy Gillespie, Frank Paparelli) - 4:07
 "Johnny Walks" - 6:20
 "Perfidia" (Alberto Domínguez) - 2:54
 "Morning Jazz" (Shreve) - 3:41

Personnel
Buddy Collette - tenor saxophone, alto saxophone, flute, clarinet
Dick Shreve - piano
John Goodman - bass
Bill Dolney - drums

References

ABC Records albums
Buddy Collette albums
1957 albums